The BYU Ballroom Dance Company originates in the Department of Dance of the College of Fine Arts and Communications at Brigham Young University (BYU) in Provo, Utah. It has been a part of BYU for nearly 50 years and competes and performs throughout the world.

History 
For years BYU offered dance classes that included several genres, but with a specific focus on social dance. BYU's dance company didn't exist until 1953 when Alma Heaton joined the faculty as a recreation professor. Heaton came to BYU having taught social dance for a nationally recognized dance studio, and it seemed logical to continue that instruction at the university level. Heaton's work set the stage for BYU to become a leader in ballroom dance. The Ballroom Dance program has been growing ever since and is now the largest collegiate ballroom dance program in the world. In 1960 Benjamin F. de Hoyos (a BYU professor in the BYU College of Health and Human Performance) founded the Ballroom Dance Company and was the director for 10 years. Following de Hoyos, Roy and June Mavor directed the company from 1970 to 1975 when Emerson Lyman and his wife LeGene took the reins. In 1980 Lee Wakefield and his wife Linda began directing the company. Starting in 2015, Curt and Sharon Holman took the reins as directors of the company and they continue to do so today. "BYU was the first university to introduce dance into its curriculum; the school's involvement in the sport stretches back for a long time," observes Brian McDonald, president of the National Dance Council of America, which governs dance competitions in the United States. "And now BYU is, without question, the most influential school in the nation in terms of identifying dance as both a sport and a respected curriculum."

Faculty 
 
Curt and Sharon Holman: Curt and his wife Sharon are former competitors in Professional Latin American and Theater Arts Category. As Cabaret dancers, they were finalists in U.S., British, and World competitions. Both have master's degrees in Dance (MFA, Brigham Young University) and are dual licentiates with the Imperial Society of Teachers of Dance. Curt, an associate Professor, is currently the division director of Ballroom Dance at Brigham Young University. Sharon directs the BYU Ballroom Dance for the youth program.
Brent Keck: Brent is a former competitor in the Professional Latin-American division and holds a master's degree in dance. He is a dual licentiate with the Imperial Society of Teachers of Dance and is recognized by the NDCA as a "Championship" judge.  Currently, Brent is the National Committee Executive Secretary for AIDA (American International Dancers Association) and is a full-time faculty member at BYU.  As an Associate Professor Brent is integral in the administration of the BYU ballroom program. His excellence in teaching and choreography is evidenced by his direction of the BYU Youth Dancesport "A" Teams which have won United States National Championship formation titles in the Youth Latin and Ballroom categories 26 Times.

Organization 
The BYU Ballroom Dance Company has 160 members and is currently composed of five teams. It is directed by Curt and Sharon Holman. The five teams include: The Touring Company, directed by Curt and Sharon Holman; The Showcase Company, directed by Brent Keck; Ensembles I (intermediate), II, and III (beginning), directed by staff members. In addition to the team directors, Mandi Johnson plays a central role in the program as the Ballroom Dance Department Secretary, managing daily office affairs, student logistics, and management at Dancesport competitions.

Competitions 

The BYU Dance Company currently competes on both the National and International Levels The most recognized competitions that BYU participates in are: The United States National Formation Championships, The World Formation Championships (NDCA), and The British Formation Championships. Though all three competitions are highly competitive, The British Formation Championship is the most prestigious event in the competitive dance arena for individual competitors (though not for formation teams). All three competitions comprise a variety of events in both the International Standard and Latin categories but the BYU Ballroom Dance Company only competes in the team formation events.

Awards 
The BYU Ballroom Dance Company has consistently won numerous prestigious awards in the competitive arena. Since 1982, the team has annually won the NDCA title of United States National Formation Dance Champions.

Since 1971, the company has competed at the highly esteemed British Open ballroom competition every three years, most often placing first in both Latin and Standard formation categories.

The BYU Ballroom Dance Company are the first Americans to win the highly esteemed British Formation Championships, and they have done so ten times.

Performances

Tours 
The BYU Ballroom Dance Company touring team has been touring since 1971; visiting many countries and cities throughout the world.

2017-18 1. New York, Virginia, Washington DC, North Carolina, Pennsylvania, New Jersey, Connecticut, Massachusetts 
2016-17 1. Chile and Argentina
2015-16 1. England, Scotland, and Wales
2014-15 1. Arizona, Utah 2. Nauvoo, IL
2013-14 1. China
2009-10 1. Utah, Nevada, California. 2. England and Scotland
2008-09 1. Idaho, Oregon, Washington 2. Mid-West and Eastern United States
2007-08 1. Arizona, Utah 2. Hong Kong, China
2006-07 1. New Mexico, Texas 2. England, Belgium, France, Switzerland, Italy, France, Spain
2005-06 1. Colorado, Wyoming 2. Ukraine, Nauvoo, IL
2004-05 1. Northern Nevada and California 2. Hawaii, New Zealand, Australia, French Polynesia, Nauvoo, IL
2003-04 1. Southern Utah, Nevada, California 2. England, Belgium, France, Spain, Nauvoo, IL
2002-03 1. Washington
2001-02 1. Wyoming 2. Mid-West and Eastern United States
2000-01 1. New Mexico, Texas 2. England, Norway, Sweden, Denmark
1999-00 1. Arizona 2. Hong Kong, People's Republic of China, Far East Russia, South Korea, Mongolia
1998-99 1. Northern Nevada, California 2. South Africa
1997-98 1. Oregon, Washington, Idaho 2. England, Scotland
1996-97 1. Southern Nevada, California 2. Estonia, Lithuania, Latvia, Russia, Finland 3. Taiwan, Malaysia, Singapore, Philippines
1995-96 1. Arizona 2. Tennessee, Arkansas, Louisiana, Mississippi, Florida, North Carolina, South Carolina, Alabama, Georgia 3. Taiwan, Malaysia
1994-95 1. New Mexico, Texas 2. England, Scotland, Belgium, Germany, France
1993-94 1. Northern Nevada, California 2. Russia, Ukraine, Hungary
1992-93 1. Washington, Oregon, Idaho 2. Utah, California, People's Republic of China, Republic of China, Thailand
1991-92 1. Utah, Nevada, Southern California 2. England, Belgium, Netherlands
1990-91 1. Northern California 2. California, Illinois, Michigan, Canada, New York, Ohio, Pennsylvania, New Jersey, Connecticut, Maryland, Washington D.C.
1989-90 1. Miami, Florida (United States Ballroom Championships) 2. Stuttgart, Germany (World Ballroom Championships) 3. Arizona 4. Tahiti, New Zealand, Australia, Hawaii
1988-89 1. Miami, Florida (United States Ballroom Championships) 2. New Mexico 3. England, Belgium, West Germany, France, Switzerland, Austria, Michigan
1987-88 1. Miami, Florida (United States Ballroom Championships) 2. Southern California 3. Tennessee, Arkansas, Georgia, Florida, Alabama, Mississippi, Louisiana
1986-87 1. Miami, Florida (United States Ballroom Championships) 2. Bremen, Germany (World Ballroom Championships) 3. Northern California 4. People's Republic of China, Republic of China, Korea, Hong Kong, Thailand
1985-86 1. Miami, Florida (United States Ballroom Championships) 2. Washington, Oregon, Idaho 3. England, New York
1984-85 1. New York (United States Ballroom Championships) 2. Southern Utah, Nevada, California 3. Jordan (Jerash Festival)
1983-84 1. New York (United States Ballroom Championships) 2. Northern California 3. People's Republic of China, Republic of China, Thailand, Hong Kong, Korea, Japan, Hawaii
1982-83 1. Southern Nevada, California, Arizona, New Mexico 2. England, Belgium, Netherlands, Germany, Austria
1981-82 1. Northwest U.S.
1980-81 1. Southern California 2. England
1979-80 1. Washington
1978-79 1. Northern California 2. England, Belgium, Netherlands
1977-78 1. Oregon, Washington, Alberta 2. Colorado, Wyoming, Nebraska, Missouri, Kansas, Oklahoma
1976-77 1. Idaho, Oregon, Washington 2. England, Scotland
1974-75 1. England
1972-73 1. New York
1971-72 1. Idaho, Oregon, Washington 2. New Mexico, Texas

Concerts 

The BYU Ballroom Dance Company annually presents Ballroom Dance in Concert and has done so for twenty-seven years. The concerts are currently performed in the Marriott Center at BYU, but prior to 1987 the concerts were performed in the Smith Field House at BYU. The pieces are the creative works of Ballroom Dance Company directors Curt & Sharon Holman, as well as guest choreographers and professional champion dancers from across the United States and Canada. The concerts first received individual names in 2003; prior concerts were simply titled "Ballroom Dance in Concert".

2015; Bravo!
2014; Light Up the Night
2013; Jump and Jive
2012; Stripes and Starz
2011; Imagine
2010; Encore
2009; Viva Espana 
2008; Seize The Beat
2007; Zoot Suit Sizzle
2006; Capture The Magic
2005; Cinemagic
2004; Rhythms of Rio
2003; Light Up The Night
2002-1982 Ballroom Dance in Concert

See also

Ballroom Dance
BYU

External links
Brigham Young University Home Page
BYU Department of Dance Performing Groups
BYU Ballroom Dance Company

References 

Ballroom Dance Company
Performing groups established in 1960
Ballroom dance
University performing groups
1960 establishments in Utah